Edmonds may refer to:
 Edmonds (surname), a surname (including a list of people with the surname)
 Edmonds, Washington, a city in Washington, US
Edmonds station (Washington), a passenger train station in Washington, US
 Edmonds station (SkyTrain), a SkyTrain station in Burnaby, British Columbia, Canada

See also
 Burnaby-Edmonds, an electoral district in British Columbia, Canada
 Edmond (disambiguation)
 Edmunds (disambiguation)

cs:Edmonds